Frederick Harmsworth (1877 – after 1903) was an English professional footballer who played as a wing half.

References

1877 births
People from the Borough of Melton
Footballers from Leicestershire
English footballers
Association football wing halves
Grimsby Town F.C. players
English Football League players
Year of death missing